Vibhut Shah (23 June 1933 - 9 February 2020) was a contemporary Gujarati novelist, playwright and short story writer from India.

Early life 
Vibhut Shah was born on 23 June 1933 in Nadiad (now in Kheda district, Gujarat, India). His father Champaklal was a lawyer. He was a second amongst three siblings. His siblings are Navin- elder brother and Asha- younger sister. His father died in 1946.

He was a law graduate and also held a diploma in library science. He served as a librarian at the High Court of Gujarat for twenty-six years. He started writing in mid-sixties and had since published many collections of short stories, one-act plays, and novels. He won eleven awards in his writing career from various institutions - predominantly from the Government organisations. He was active in the Gujarati theatre movement and also wrote radio plays. Some of his notable books are Asangati, Ambiya-Bahar, Kartak Kare Shringar and Angaar - Ashlesh.

He completed his primary education from Nadiad and secondary education from Kheda. He completed B. A. in English and Gujarati in 1956 from L. D. Arts College affiliated to Gujarat University, Ahmedabad. He received LL. B. and a diploma in Library Science in 1963 from Maharaja Sayajirao University of Baroda. In 1957, he moved to Jamnagar and joined M. P. Shah Medical College as a librarian where he worked from 1957 to 1965. He served as a Chief Librarian in the Gujarat High Court from 1966 to his retirement.

Literary career

1959 - 1968 
During his B. A. studies, he was influenced by Niranjan Bhagat and S. R. Bhatt who inspired him to study contemporary literature as well as write his first short-story Dhummas Ni Shristi in 1959. It was published in Yuvak magazine in 1960. He wrote several other short stories during 1960- 1963 some of them were published in local magazine Kumar and newspaper Sandesh. His writing halted when he went to Vadodara for two years from 1962 to 1963 to study Library Science from The Maharaja Sayajirao University of Baroda.

He resumed writing again with the short stories that he penned during 1966- 1968 which were later published in magazines like Navneet Samarpan, Kruti, Srirang and Ruchi. While he was studying law in Jamnagar's law college, he wrote his first radio play Pratishodh in 1965 for the Best Radio-Play Competition by Ahmedabad's radio station Aakashvani. The radio play was a success and he wrote about one hundred more plays over the years for the radio station, which they broadcast on regular basis.

1968 - 1987 
Vibhut Shah's first short story collection Tekariyo Par Vasant Bethi Chhe was published in 1968 which was very well received by critics and earned him recognition in Gujarati literature. He also won the Best Book of The Year second prize for this book from Gujarat Government in 1969. He wrote his first one-act plays collection Laal Piro Ane Vadari in 1970, which received the Best One Act Plays Collection of The Year award by Gujarat Government. This book was also later included as a curriculum course in Bachelor of Arts discipline in Saurastra University in 1972. After the success of Laal Piro Ane Vadari, he penned the second one-act plays collection titled Shanti Na Pakshi in 1974 that also received the Best One Act Plays Collection of The Year award by the Gujarat Government in 1975. In 1979, his three-act play Bheena Bheena Dankh ran successfully twenty shows in Ahmedabad produced by Natyadeep - the institute he established to perform Gujarati plays in the state.

1988 - 2012 
After the vast recognition and acclaim for Vibhutbhai's literature work of short stories and one-act plays, he ventured into writing novels. His first novel was Asangati that he wrote during 1987 - 1988. The novel was a huge success and won Vibhutbhai the Best Novel of the Year award in 1989 by Gujarat Sahitya Akademi. Following the success of his first novel, he authored several other novels during the later years of 1989 to 2005 that earned him recognition and established his name in contemporary Gujarati literature as a novelist. His novels during this period include Saptaparna (1989), Amavasya (1990), Sambhavami (1992), Agnimegh (1993), Ambiya-Bahar (1995), Kartak Kare Shringar (2001), Angar-Ashlesh (2003) and Na Sur Na Sargam (2005).

During this period, Vibhutbhai also penned two One-act Plays collections namely Mamuni Na Shyam Gulab and Nat Kedar in 1990 and 1992 respectively. He also wrote two Short-stories collection books Flower Vase (1988) and Kunjar (1994). Flower Vase won the first prize of Best Short-stories Collection Award by Gujarat Sahitya Akademi in 1989 and Mamuni Na Shyam Gulab was awarded the second prize of Shri Batubhai Umarvadia Award for Best One-act play in 1992.

After a long hiatus, Vibhut Shah released his last short stories collection titled Shesh Kathachakra in April 2012.

Awards 
The awards won by Vibhut Shah during his writing career

Major work acknowledged in other form of media and arts

Novels published in Gujarati newspapers 
During Vibhutbhai's active writing career, some of his novels were published in Sunday edition of leading Gujarati newspapers making his name well known amongst avid Gujarati novel readers. Vibhutbhai's first novel ever published in a newspaper was Saptaparna in 1989 when Mr Hasmukh Gandhi, the then chief editor of the newspaper Samakalin, contacted Vibhutbhai to seek his consent to publish the novel in Samakalin's Sunday edition. This novel was also published simultaneously in the newspaper Jansatta and was very well received. After Saptaparna's positive feedback from readers, these two newspapers published another novel of Vibhutbhai Sambhavami in 1992. This trend continued with several other novels appearing in later years in leading newspapers like Gujarat Samachar, Sandesh, Jansatta and Mumbai Samachar. The novels thus published were Ambiya-Bahar in Sandesh (1994), Kartak Kare Shringar in Jansatta (1998–99), Angar Ashlesh in Gujarat Samachar (2003) and Na Sur Na Saragam in Mumbai Samachar (2004–05).

Inclusion in study courses 
Vibhutbhai's first one-act plays collection 'Laal Piro Ane Vadari' was included as a curriculum course in Bachelor of Arts discipline in Saurastra University in 1972. In 1993, the radio-play he wrote for Akashvani radio station 'Fakt Pandar Minute' (Only Fifteen Minutes) was also included as one of the short study courses for tenth grade Gujarati language course by Gujarat Secondary Education Board (GSEB), Gandhinagar and it stayed for twelve years.

Plays 
In 1978, there was a telefilm made based on Vibhutbhai's first radio-play 'Pratishodh' and was later telecast on the local television channel of Ahmedabad called 'Ahmedabad Doordarshan'. Another three-act play, that Vibhutbhai wrote, 'Jambli Rang Ni Kanya' (Purple coloured girl) was also staged in Ahmedabad in 1998 by the institute 'Rangbahar'.
Other National Blind Institute of Mumbai produced an audio cassette-set of his novel 'Amavasya' for blind people in 2004–05. In July 2008, Vibhut Shah's short story 'Manasnu Maun' (The face of a man) was selected by Shri Suresh Dalal as one of the best short stories in Gujarati in his compilation "Varta-Viswa" published in August 2010.

Other contribution to Gujarati literature 
During his very active writing years, Vibhutbhai also served in the judges panel of One Act Plays Competition organised by INT drama institute of Mumbai in association with the leading Gujarati newspaper Gujarat Samachar wherein amateur artists from the Gujarat colleges participated. He also wrote critical reviews of these competitions for Gujarat Samachar newspaper from 1989 to 2006.

Bibliography 
The complete list of Vibhut Shah's bibliography:

See also
 List of Gujarati-language writers

References 

1933 births
Indian male novelists
Indian male short story writers
Dramatists and playwrights from Gujarat
Gujarat University alumni
20th-century Indian short story writers
20th-century Indian novelists
Novelists from Gujarat
Writers from Ahmedabad
20th-century Indian male writers
Gujarati-language writers
Maharaja Sayajirao University of Baroda alumni
People from Nadiad
Indian librarians
Living people